The Eternal Struggle is a 1921 German silent drama film directed by Paul L. Stein and starring Lotte Neumann, Alfons Fryland, and Harry Hardt.

The film's sets were designed by the art director Robert Neppach.

Cast

References

External links

Films of the Weimar Republic
German silent feature films
Films directed by Paul L. Stein
UFA GmbH films
German drama films
1921 drama films
German black-and-white films
Silent drama films
1920s German films
1920s German-language films